Gamal Gorkeh Nkrumah (born 1959) is a Ghanaian journalist, a Pan-Africanist and an editor of Al Ahram Weekly newspaper. He is the eldest son of the first president of Ghana, Kwame Nkrumah, and his Egyptian wife Fathia Nkrumah.

Gamal Nkrumah received his doctorate in political science from the School of Oriental and African Studies in London. He initially worked as a political journalist at Al-Ahram Weekly in Cairo for over 15 years. Presently, he is editor of the international affairs section at the newspaper.

Notes

External links
 The Kwame Nkrumah Pan-African Cultural Centre
 ChatAfrik Inc.
 Information source on aspects of Kwame Nkrumah's life and works

Living people
Egyptian journalists
Ghanaian people of Coptic descent
Ghanaian people of Egyptian descent
Kwame Nkrumah
Ghanaian journalists
Alumni of SOAS University of London
People from Accra
Children of national leaders
1959 births
21st-century journalists